Tobi 17 - Coptic Calendar - Tobi 19

The eighteenth day of the Coptic month of Tobi, the fifth month of the Coptic year. On a common year, this day corresponds to January 13, of the Julian Calendar, and January 26, of the Gregorian Calendar. This day falls in the Coptic Season of Shemu, the season of the Harvest.

Commemorations

Saints 

 The commemoration of Saints Mary and Martha, the sister of Saint Lazarus
 The departure of Saint James, Bishop of Nisibis 
 The departure of Abba Andrew, Abou El-Leif

References 

Days of the Coptic calendar